Ululodinae is a subfamily or tribe (as Ululodini) of owlflies. Both they and the Ascalaphinae are sometimes known as split-eyed owlflies due to the characteristic ridge that bisects their compound eyes.

References 

Myrmeleontidae
Insect subfamilies